Jasper-Pulaski Fish and Wildlife Area is a hunting & fishing wildlife area administered by the Indiana Department of Natural Resource's Division of Fish & Wildlife. The Division of Fish & Wildlife is dedicated to providing a quality hunting & fishing area while maintaining 8,179 acres of wetland, upland and woodland game habitat.

The property's suitable habitat also provides an ideal stopover for migratory birds, such as the more than 10,000 sandhill cranes that stop during fall migration.

The office for this property is located Medaryville, in northwestern Indiana. The property itself spans three counties: the majority of the land is in both northwestern Pulaski County & northeastern Jasper County, with a small area of land jutting into southwestern Starke County. 

The widely used Jasper-Pulaski Shooting Range, is physically in Walker Township which is considered unincorporated Wheatfield, in Jasper County. The physical/911 address for the shooting range is 4106 E. 850 N. Wheatfield, IN. The shooting range sits in the Central Time Zone. The archery range is located on County Road 1650 W in Medaryville, just north of the Sandhill Crane Observation Area.

The time zone line which runs north and south along the Jasper-Pulaski County border splits the property nearly in half from east to west. The time zone line runs through the pasture where the cranes tend to gather. The western half of the property is in Jasper County, utilizing Central Time with much of the eastern portion of the property being in Pulaski County which uses Eastern Time. The time zone line that runs through the property from east to west separating the eastern portion of the property on the Pulaski & Starke County borders. The northeast portion of the property is in Starke County, IN. Starke County, like Jasper County, utilizes the Central Time Zone.  

The shooting range and the archery range are both open to the public, each with no fees and each with their own check-in areas. While there are no fees for hunting, fishing, use of the shooting or archery ranges, or just stopping by to catch a glimpse of the sandhill cranes, all property users are required to sign in prior to using the property. The self-service sign-in for all activities other than the shooting range and archery range is located in the main parking lot and is open 24/7.

In addition to state fish and wildlife laws, this property is governed by posted regulations affecting the public use of lands and facilities owned, leased or licensed by the Department of Natural Resources. Parking is available throughout the property with signage designating appropriate parking throughout the property.

External links
Indiana DNR Division of Fish and Wildlife: Jasper-Pulaski

Gallery

Protected areas of Jasper County, Indiana
Protected areas of Pulaski County, Indiana
Protected areas of Starke County, Indiana
Nature reserves in Indiana